The 2011 Swedish Open was a tennis tournament played on outdoor clay courts part of the ATP World Tour 250 Series of the 2011 ATP World Tour and 2011 WTA Tour. It took place in Båstad, Sweden, from 4 July through 10 July 2011 for women's and from 11 July through 17 July 2011 for men's. It was also known as 2011 Collector Swedish Open for the Women's and 2011 SkiStar Swedish Open for the Men's for sponsorship reasons. It was the 3rd edition for the Women's, while the 64th for the Men's.

WTA entrants

Players

Seedings are based on the rankings of June 21, 2011.

Other entrants
The following players received wildcards into the singles main draw:
  Ellen Allgurin
  Anna Brazhnikova
  Hilda Melander

The following players received entry from the qualifying draw:

  Tetyana Arefyeva
  Mona Barthel
  Alizé Lim
  Olivia Rogowska

ATP entrants

Seeds

Seedings are based on the rankings of July 4, 2011.

Other entrants
The following players received wildcards into the singles main draw:
  Christian Lindell
  Michael Ryderstedt
  Andreas Vinciguerra

The following players received  entry as a special exempt into the singles main draw:
  Michael Yani

The following players received entry from the qualifying draw:

  Jonathan Dasnières de Veigy
  Diego Junqueira
  Guillermo Olaso
  Antonio Veić

Finals

Men's singles

 Robin Söderling defeated  David Ferrer, 6–2, 6–2
It was Söderling's fourth title of the year and tenth of his career. It was his second win at Båstad, having also won in 2009. It was also his last match of his career as he was plagued by injuries for the next 4 years and retired in December 2015.

Women's singles

 Polona Hercog defeated  Johanna Larsson, 6–4, 7–5
It was Hercog's first career title.

Men's doubles

 Robert Lindstedt /  Horia Tecău defeated  Simon Aspelin /  Andreas Siljeström, 6–3, 6–3

Women's doubles

 Lourdes Domínguez Lino /  María José Martínez Sánchez defeated  Nuria Llagostera Vives /  Arantxa Parra Santonja, 6–3, 6–3

References
 Official website

2011 ATP World Tour
2011 WTA Tour
2011
 
July 2011 sports events in Europe

pl:Collector Swedish Open 2011